Askey is a surname. Notable people with the name include:

 Arthur Askey (1900–1982), British comedian
 Anthea Askey (1933–1999), English actress
 Colin Askey (born 1932), English footballer
 Gil Askey (1925–2014), American jazz trumpeter, composer, producer and musical director
 John Askey (born 1964), English footballer
 Richard Askey (born 1933), American mathematician
 Tom Askey (born 1974), American ice hockey goaltender

See also
 ASCII, a computer character set